The 2009–10 Women's CEV Cup was the 38th edition of the European CEV Cup volleyball club tournament, the former Top Teams Cup.

Teams of the 2009–2010
The number of participants on the basis of ranking list for European Cup Competitions

Play-off

1/16 Finals
1st leg 2–3 December 2009
2nd leg 8–10 December 2009
The 16 winning teams from the 1/16 Finals will compete in the 1/8 Finals playing Home & Away
matches. The losers of the 1/16 Final matches will qualify for the 3rd round in Challenge Cup.

1/8 Finals
1st leg  5–7 January 2010
2nd leg 12–14 January 2010

1/4 Finals
1st leg  16–18 February 2010
2nd leg 23–25 February 2010

Final four
Baku, 20 & 21 March 2010:

Semi-finals

|}

Match 3/4

|}

Match 1/2

|}

Awards
Winners:
MVP:  Carmen Turlea (Yamamay Busto Arsizio)
Best scorer:  Carmen Turlea (Yamamay Busto Arsizio)
Best spiker:  Sanja Starović (Rabita Baku)
Best server:  Stefana Veljković (ZOK Crvena Zvezda Beograd)
Best blocker:  Lucia Crisanti (Yamamay Busto Arsizio)
Best receiver:  Tamara Rakić (ZOK Crvena Zvezda Beograd)
Best libero:  Silvija Popović (Rabita Baku)
Best setter:  Bojana Živković (ZOK Crvena Zvezda Beograd)

References

External links
CEV Website

2009–10
CEV Cup
CEV Cup